Eastern Orthodoxy is the major Christian denomination in Serbia, with 6,079,396 followers or 69.9% of the population, followed traditionally by the majority of Serbs, and also Romanians and Vlachs, Montenegrins, Macedonians and Bulgarians living in Serbia. The dominant Eastern Orthodox church in Serbia is the Serbian Orthodox Church. Also, the Romanian Orthodox Church has its own Diocese of Dacia Felix that operates among Orthodox Romanians in Serbian Banat and the Timok Valley.

History

Late Antiquity and early Middle Ages

During Late Antiquity, on the territory of present-day Serbia there were several major Christian centers and episcopal sees, including Sirmium, Singidunum, Viminacium, Naissus, Ulpiana and others. In 535, Byzantine emperor Justinian I created new Archbishopric of Justiniana Prima, centered in the city of Justiniana Prima near present-day town of Lebane in central Serbia.

Middle Ages and early Modern Period

The identity of ethnic Serbs was historically based on Orthodox Christianity; the Serbian Orthodox Church, to the extent that some people claimed that those who were not Orthodox, were not Serbs. The Christianization of the Serbian lands took place in the 9th century, and Serbia (the Serbian Principality) is accounted Christian as of 870, when the Eparchy of Ras and Braničevo were founded, confirmed by the Eighth Ecumenical Council (879-880). The Serbian bishoprics became part of the Archbishopric of Ohrid, after the Byzantine conquest of the Bulgarian Empire in 1018. The  Slavic language replaced the Greek in liturgical language.

With the Great Schism in 1054 (precipitated by Humbert of Silva Candida and his colleagues who entered the church of the Hagia Sophia during Michael I Cerularius's divine liturgy and placed the Charter on the altar.), Serbia remained under Constantinople, while neighbouring Croatia remained under Rome. The Serbian Orthodox Church was given autocephaly in 1219, when Archbishop Sava received recognition from the exiled Ecumenical Patriarch. In 1346, it was raised to the rank of Patriarchate. During the late Middle Ages and Early Modern period, Serbian Patriarchate of Peć (1346-1766) had at its peak more than forty eparchies.

Serbian Orthodox Church in Serbia
Fifteen eparchies (dioceses) of the Serbian Orthodox Church cover the territory of Serbia: 
 Archbishopric of Belgrade and Karlovci, patriarchal eparchy
 Eparchy of Bačka, with seat in Novi Sad
 Eparchy of Banat, with seat in Vršac
 Eparchy of Braničevo, with seat in Požarevac
 Eparchy of Kruševac, with seat in Kruševac
 Eparchy of Mileševa, with seat in Prijepolje (partially covers southwestern region of Serbia and northwestern region of Montenegro)
 Eparchy of Niš, with seat in Niš
 Eparchy of Raška and Prizren, with seat in Prizren
 Eparchy of Šabac, with seat in Šabac
 Eparchy of Srem, with seat in Sremski Karlovci
 Eparchy of Šumadija, with seat in Kragujevac
 Eparchy of Timok, with seat in Zaječar
 Eparchy of Valjevo, with seat in Valjevo
 Eparchy of Vranje, with seat in Vranje
 Eparchy of Žiča, with seat in Kraljevo

Gallery

See also 
Christianity in Serbia
Religion in Serbia
Demographics of Serbia
Serbian Orthodox Church
Eastern Orthodoxy in Europe

References

Sources

 

 
 

 
Members of the World Council of Churches
Eastern Orthodoxy in Europe
Serbian Orthodox Church in Serbia